Sulaoja  (also: Sulaoja-Lullu) is a village in Kanepi Parish, Põlva County in southeastern Estonia. Prior to the 2017 administrative reform of Estonian local governments, the village belonged to Valgjärve Parish.

References

 

Villages in Põlva County